Bohdan Hoza (born ) is a Ukrainian weightlifter, and Junior World Champion. He won the gold medal in the 2022 Junior World Weightlifting Championships in the 109 kg event.

He holds the junior world record in the snatch 109 kg division.

Major results

References

External links 
 

Ukrainian male weightlifters
2002 births
Living people
21st-century Ukrainian people